Cherifa Kersit (born 1 January 1967) is a Moroccan singer in the genre of Tamawayt. Cherifa sings in Central Atlas Tamazight.

Biography
Cherifa was born in Tazrout M'oukhbou, in the region of Khenifra in the Middle Atlas mountains of Morocco, in a family of 16 children. As the girls of her age in the region, she never went to school and spend her days in daily duties in the countryside, where she learned traditional singing.
Cherifa started to sing professionally against the will of her family, and have performed with well-known artists such as Mohamed Rouicha and Mohamed Maghni. In 1999, Cherifa made her first visit to France where she participated in the show "Dances and song by the Woman of Morocco, from dawn to dusk". In 2002, she released her first album Berber Blues.

Discography

2002

Berber Blues 

 Idhrdh Umalu Z Iâari 
 Maysh Yiwin May Tshawrth?
 Ndda S Adbib Nnani
 Ma Gn Tufit Amazir?
 Isul Isul Umarg Nsh Awadigi 
 Tahidust: Wllah Ar Thagh Lafiyt G Ul Usmun

References

1967 births
Berber musicians
Living people